Wa (Va) is an Austroasiatic language spoken by the Wa people of Myanmar and China. There are three distinct varieties, sometimes considered separate languages; their names in Ethnologue are Parauk, the majority and standard form; Vo (Zhenkang Wa, 40,000 speakers) and Awa (100,000 speakers), though all may be called Wa, Awa, Va, Vo. David Bradley (1994) estimates there are total of 820,000 Wa speakers.

Distribution and variants
Gerard Diffloth refers to the Wa geographic region as the "Wa corridor", which lies between the Salween and Mekong Rivers. According to Diffloth, variants include South Wa, "Bible Wa" and Kawa (Chinese Wa).

Christian Wa are more likely to support the use of Standard Wa, since their Bible is based on a standard version of Wa, which is in turn based on the variant spoken in Bang Wai, 150 miles north of Kengtung (Watkins 2002). Bang Wai is located in Northern Shan State, Burma, close to the Chinese border where Cangyuan County is located.

Certain dialects of Wa preserve a final -/s/. They include the variants spoken in Meung Yang and Ximeng County (such as a variety spoken in Zhongke 中课, Masan 马散, Ximeng County that was documented by Zhou & Yan (1984)) (Watkins 2002:8).

Burma
David Bradley (1994) estimates that there is a total of about 500,000 Wa speakers in Burma.

A small number of Wa speakers also reside in Taunggyi, Mandalay and Yangon.

China
The PRC writing system for Wa is based on the Wa variant in Aishuai, Cangyuan County, Yunnan.

David Bradley (1994) estimates that there are 322,000 Wa speakers in China. In China, the Wa people live in (Watkins 2002):

Ximeng County (83% of total)
Cangyuan County (71% of total)
Menglian County (over 25% of total; other ethnic groups include the Dai and Lahu)
Gengma County
Shuangjiang County
Lancang County

A small number of Wa speakers also reside in Kunming and throughout various parts of Yunnan.

The three dialects of Wa (and their respective subdialects) according to Zhou et al. (2004) are:

1. Baraoke 巴饶克: ~ 250,000 speakers; autonym: 
Aishi 艾师 subdialect: 218,000 speakers
Cangyuan County: Yanshi 岩师, Tuanjie 团结, Mengsheng 勐省, Nuoliang 糯良, Danjia 单甲, Mengjiao 勐角, Menglai 勐来, Yonghe 永和
Shuangjiang County: Shahe 沙河, Mengmeng 勐勐, Nanlang 南榔
Gengma County: Sipaishan 四排山, Gengyi 耿宜, Hepai 贺派, Mengjian 勐简, Mengding 孟定, Furong 付荣
Lancang County: Donghe 东河, Wendong 文东, Shangyun 上允, Xuelin 雪林
Banhong 班洪 subdialect: 35,000 speakers
Cangyuan County: Banhong 班洪, Banlao 班老, most of Nanla 南腊
Dazhai 大寨 subdialect: 3,000 speakers
Gengma County: Mengjian 勐简, Dazhai 大寨
2. Awa (Ava) 阿佤: ~ 100,000 speakers; autonym: 
Masan 马散 subdialect: 60,000 speakers
Ximeng County: Mowo 莫窝, Xinchang 新厂, Zhongke 中课, Mengsuo 勐梭, Yuesong 岳宋, Wenggake 翁戛科, parts of Lisuo 力所
Awalai 阿佤来 subdialect: 3,000 speakers
Ximeng County: Awalai 阿佤来 in Lisuo 力所
Damangnuo 大芒糯 subdialect: 30,000 speakers
Menglian County: Fuyan 富岩, Gongxin 公信, Lalei 腊垒, Nanya 南雅
Ximeng County: parts of Wengjiake 翁戛科
Xiyun 细允 subdialect: 5,000 speakers
Lancang County: Xiyun 细允 in Donghui 东回
Menglian County: Shuangbo 双柏 in Mengman 勐满
3. Wa 佤: ~ 40,000 speakers; autonym: 
Yongde County: Dedang 德党, Menggong 孟汞, Minglang 明朗, Mengban 勐板, Yongkang 永康, Dashan 大山
Zhenkang County: Mangbing 忙丙, Muchang 木厂
Cangyuan County: parts of Nanla 南腊

Jackson Sun (2018a) lists the Awa dialects and their alternate names as follows.
Masan 馬散 (Lavïa; Ravia; Avë; Avo; etc.). Sun (2018b) documents the Lavïa [la-vɨɒʔ] variety of Banzhe 班哲 (pa-cʰək) Village, Mengka 勐卡 (məŋkʰa) Town in Ximeng County, Yunnan Province. Lavïa of Banzhe is non-tonal and sesquisyllabic.
Awalai 阿佤來 (Avëloy)
Damangnuo 大芒糯 (Vo)
Xiyun 細允 (Va [vàʔ]). Sun (2018a) documents the Va variety of Yingla 英臘 (zoŋráʔ) Village, Wenggake 翁嘎科 Township, Ximeng 西盟 County, Pu'er 普洱 City, Yunnan Province. Va of Yingla is monosyllabic has 3 tones, which are high, mid and low. Sun (2018a) notes that the Va varieties of Yingla and neighboring villages in Wenggake 翁戛科 Township of Ximeng County belong to the same dialect as varieties spoken farther away in Donghui 东回 and Nuofu 糯福 Townships, Lancang County.

Yan and Zhou (2012:138) list the following names for Wa in various counties.
,  (巴饶克): in Lancang, Gengma, Shuangjiang, Lancang counties; exonyms: Small Kawa 小卡瓦, Kawa 卡瓦, Cooked Ka 熟卡, Lajia 腊家
 (佤): in Zhenkang and Yongde counties; exonyms: Benren 本人
 (斡),  (阿卫),  (日佤): in Ximeng and Menglian counties; exonyms: Big Kawa 大卡瓦, Raw Ka 生卡, Wild Ka 野卡
 (卡瓦来): in Cangyuan and Gengma counties; also called  (瓦)

A language known as Bujiao 补角 (autonym: Puga 仆嘎) in Mengla County was mentioned in Yunnan (1960) The Bujiao were classified as ethnic Bulang and had a population of 212 in 1960.

The Kela 克拉 (Dai exonym: Kala 卡拉; population: 393 people) live in District 3 三区 of Tengchong County 腾冲县, Yunnan (You 2013:359). The Kela used to speak a variety of Wa, but now speak only Chinese. The Kela also refer to themselves as the Wama 佤妈.

Thailand
Wa have also migrated to Thailand in the past several decades, mainly from Burma. There are about 10,000 Wa speakers in Thailand. Wa villages can be found in (Watkins 2002:6):

Mae Sai District, Chiang Rai Province, close to the Burmese border
Mae Yao subdistrict near Chiang Rai City
Wiang Pa Pao District, in southern Chiang Rai Province
Chiang Dao District, Chiang Mai Province

Phonology
Standard Wa is a non-tonal language. However, tone has developed in some of the dialects. There is correspondence between tones in tonal dialects and tenseness in non-tonal dialects.

In Wa, there are 44 phonemes; 35 consonants and 9 vowels. All of these vowels can be tense or lax. Tenseness is a phonemic feature in syllables with unaspirated initials.

Vowels

There are 15 diphthongs: iu, ɯi, ui, ia, ɤi, ua, ei, ou, oi~ɔi, ai, aɯ, au and 2 triphthongs: iau, uai. The general syllabic structure of Wa is C(C)(V)V(V)(C). Only a few words have zero-initials.

Consonants

Script

The Wa language formerly had no script and some of the few Wa that were literate used Chinese characters, while others used the Shan language and its script. Christian missionary work among the Wa began at the beginning of the 20th century first in the Burmese and later in the Chinese areas of the Wa territory. It was led by William Marcus Young, from Nebraska. The first transcription of the Wa language was devised by Young and Sara Yaw Shu Chin (Joshua) in 1931 with the purpose of translating the Bible. This first Wa alphabet was based on the Latin script and the very first publication was a compilation of Wa hymns in 1933, the Wa New Testament being completed in 1938. This transcription, known as Bible orthography, is known as lǎowǎwén 老佤文 old Wa orthography in Chinese, and is now used mainly in the Burmese Wa areas and among the Wa in Thailand through the materials published by the Wa Welfare Society (Cub Yuh Bwan Ka son Vax, Cub Pa Yuh Phuk Lai Vax, Phuk Lai Hak Tiex Vax) in Chiang Mai.

In 1956, a transcription adapted to the new pinyin romanization, known as new Wa orthography, "PRC orthography" or "Chinese orthography", was developed for the Wa people in China. However, its publications, mainly propagated through the Yunnan administration, are yet to reach a wider public beyond academics. This transcription, which originally included even a couple of letters of the Cyrillic script, has also since been revised. Despite the revisions, both the Chinese and the Bible orthography are still marred by inconsistencies.

Recently, a revised Bible orthography adopting some features from the Chinese orthography has been adopted as Wa State Wa orthography or "official Wa spelling" by the central authorities of the Wa State in Pangkham which have published a series of primers in order to improve the literacy of the United Wa State Army troops. Also, after 2000 Wa people in social networks such as Facebook, as well as Wa songwriters in karaoke lyrics of Wa songs, use this Myanmar (revised Bible) orthography in its main variations.

See also
Wa people

References

Further reading

 
 
 Schiller, Eric (1985). An (Initially) Surprising Wa language and Mon-Khmer Word Order. University of Chicago Working Papers in Linguistics (UCWIPL) 1.104–119.
 
 Watkins, Justin (2013). Dictionary of Wa (2 vols). Leiden: Brill.

External links
 Some links to Wa-related Internet sites
 A Dictionary of the Wa Language with Burmese (Myanmar), Chinese, and English Glosses and Internet Database for Minority Languages of Burma (Myanmar)
 ワ語の発音と表記 (Pronunciation and spelling of Wa; in Japanese)
 RWAAI | Projects RWAAI (Repository and Workspace for Austroasiatic Intangible Heritage)
 http://hdl.handle.net/10050/00-0000-0000-0003-7BBF-9@view Parauk in RWAAI Digital Archive
 Consonant Ear Training Tape
 The XG1 collection in Kaipuleohone includes Awa language open access materials.

Austroasiatic languages
Palaungic languages
Languages of Myanmar
Languages of China
Languages written in Latin script
Severely endangered languages
Wa people